Andrey Rum (born 19 January 2002) is a Belarusian professional footballer who plays for Slutsk.

References

External links 
 
 

2002 births
Living people
People from Lida
Sportspeople from Grodno Region
Belarusian footballers
Association football defenders
FC Slutsk players